Camp Sherman is an Ohio Army National Guard training site near Chillicothe, Ohio. It was established in 1917 after the U.S. entered World War I and today serves as a training site for National Guard Soldiers.

Between June and September 1917, the Army constructed 2,000 buildings at the Camp Sherman site, which included "Mound City," an enclosure and collection of earthworks left by the native Hopewell culture. In the process, some ancient earthworks were damaged or destroyed.

In 2009 the remaining National Guard facility was renamed Camp Sherman Joint Training Center.

As of 2023, Unioto High School is on the former grounds of Camp Sherman.

References 

Installations of the United States Army National Guard
Military installations in Ohio
Ohio National Guard
Buildings and structures in Chillicothe, Ohio
1917 establishments in Ohio
Military installations established in 1917